Diana Micaela Abreu de Sousa e Silva (born 4 June 1995), commonly known as Diana Silva, is a Portuguese professional footballer who plays as a forward for Sporting and the Portugal women's national football team.

Career 
Silva started playing football at six years old. When she was 13, she started playing for Atlético Ouriense's boys' team before being promoted straight into their women's team as Atlético Ouriense had no girls' youth team. She later moved to Clube de Albergaria. In 2016, she moved to the newly recreated Sporting Lisbon Lionesses. Silva was among the first names revealed to have joined Sporting's new women's team after the club had been 21 years without one. During this year she also started studying for a university degree in pharmaceutical sciences at the University of Lisbon. She won the Campeonato Nacional de Futebol Feminino with Sporting in her first year there.

International career
Silva played for the Portugal women's national under-19 football team during the UEFA Women's Under-19 Championship. She made her debut for the full Portugal women's national football team in March 2014. In 2017, she was selected as a part of Portugal's debut squad in the 2017 UEFA Women's Championship. During the tournament, she received praise for her performance against the Scotland women's national football team. She also played in Portugal's final group match against the England women's national football team however Portugal lost 2–1 and were eliminated.

Career statistics

Club
.

International goals
As of match played 4 March 2020. Portugal score listed first, score column indicates score after each Silva goal.

References

External links
 
 

1995 births
Living people
Women's association football forwards
Portuguese women's footballers
People from Amadora
Portuguese people of African descent
Women of African descent
Portugal women's international footballers
Campeonato Nacional de Futebol Feminino players
Sporting CP (women's football) players
Atlético Ouriense players
Clube de Albergaria players
Aston Villa W.F.C. players
Sportspeople from Lisbon District
UEFA Women's Euro 2022 players
UEFA Women's Euro 2017 players